Sheikh Md Monirul Islam is a retired Major General of Bangladesh Army and Chief External & Corporate Affairs Officer of bKash.

Career 
Islam was commissioned in the East Bengal Regiment.

From 1988 to 1989, Islam served in United Nation forces in Iraq.

Islam has  masters from National University of Bangladesh, Madras University, and an MBA from Trinity University. He is a graduate of National Defence College.

Islam had served as the Director General of the Special Security Force. On 20 April 2008, he was appointed the Director General of National Security Intelligence. He also served as the Director General of Bangladesh Institute of International and Strategic Studies.

Islam served as the Sylhet Cantonment Area Commander in 2010.

After retiring from Bangladesh Army he joined bKash as Chief External & Corporate Affairs Officer.

References 

Living people
Bangladesh Army generals
Year of birth missing (living people)
Directors General of National Security Intelligence
National Defence College (Bangladesh) alumni